Big Z may refer to:

People
Carlos Zambrano (born 1981), Venezuelan baseball pitcher in Major League Baseball
Zach Zenner (born 1991), NFL running back for the Detroit Lions
Zbigniew Brzezinski (1928–2017), Polish-American political scientist
Zdeno Chára (born 1977), Slovak ice hockey player
Zelmo Beaty (1939–2013), basketball player in the National Basketball Association and American Basketball Association
Zydrunas Ilgauskas (born 1975), Lithuanian basketball player in the National Basketball Association
Žydrūnas Savickas (born 1975), Lithuanian strongman

Fictional characters
Zangief, a character from the Street Fighter Series
Zaphod Beeblebrox, fictional President of the Universe from the Hitchhiker's Guide
Zapp Brannigan, fictional starship captain from Futurama
Zeke "Big Z" Topanga, a fictional penguin from the 2007 film, Surf's Up